= Kodjo Deynoo =

Poet

- Born: Kodjo Dee; 27 December; Accra, Ghana
- Occupations: Author, poet,

Kodjo Dee also known as The Man With The Plan, is a British Ghanaian poet.

== Life and career ==
Kodjo Dee spent his early years of education in Ghana, completing SHS at St. Johns Grammar Secondary School in Accra, Achimota. He completed his first degree and Masters in Britain at the University of the West of England. After completion, he undertook a one-year poetry class course with the Bristol Art Council, he also worked in the built environment in the UK for many years before coming back to Ghana to form a Risk Consultancy Firm. His work, The Queen’s Speech and When Good Men Go To War was published on the United Nations website in a poetry for peace contest. In 2013 Kodjo's poetry blog won Best Original Content at Ghana's Blogcamp award ceremony which was titled Content is King. The Award is recognised and supported by many organisations including, the American Embassy in Ghana and Google’s office in Ghana.

Kodjo featured in Kwame Writes, Vocal portraits 2 album with a song titled My Area Girl with Yogendra, Ansong featured and produced by Drumnayshin in 2015

In 2018 Kodjo worked with Jake the Songbird and Painy kella on a few songs which included, Street Melodies, TipToe Lane, Oh What a Life, Mama Pray for Me, How I 4 Do, Bre bre Obaa hemma.

== Selected published works ==
- I Learnt Yoga, I Do Yoga
- Obama Care
- Story, Story Told
- St. Catherine At Court
- A Message In A Shell
- Lost Love
- Phoenix Breaths
- I Love A Book
- Briss Bristol
- The Drinking Pub House
- What Is Wave Length
- Don't Let Me Fall
- A Ghanaian Caskets
